Smalininkai is a small city in Lithuania.

Name
The name describes a place of tar and pitch burners ("smala": tar, pitch; -ingken: village).

History
Since 1422 Treaty of Melno, it was a border village at the Lithuanian-Teutonic customs frontier. In 1454, King Casimir IV Jagiellon incorporated the region to the Kingdom of Poland upon the request of the anti-Teutonic Prussian Confederation. After the subsequent Thirteen Years' War (1454–1466) the village was a part of Poland as a fief held by the Teutonic Knights, and thus was located within the Polish–Lithuanian union, later elevated into the Polish–Lithuanian Commonwealth. From the 18th century, it was part of the Kingdom of Prussia, and from 1871 it was also part of Germany, within which it was administratively located in the province of East Prussia. In 1792 it was appointed to a market town. In 1845 the village became a parish and 1878 a church was built there. In the late 19th century, the village had a population of 709, which was mostly employed in agriculture, shipping and timber trade. Large quantities of spirit were sold to Russia, while Polish rafters bought wooden pipes here. In 1902 a light railway was built from Pogegen (Pagėgiai) to Schmalleningken (Smalininkai). Following World War I, in 1918, Lithuania regained independence, and in 1923 eventually obtained the region. In 1925, the village had 1,741 inhabitants. In 1939, it was annexed by Nazi Germany and incorporated into the Landkreis Tilsit-Ragnit (district). The German occupation lasted until the end of World War II in 1945.

References

Literature
 Kurschat, Heinrich A.: Das Buch vom Memelland, Siebert Oldenburg 1968

Cities in Lithuania
Cities in Tauragė County